Sorkh Sara (also Romanized as Sorkh Sarā; also known as Sorkh Sarāy) is a village in Dasht-e Taybad Rural District, Miyan Velayat District, Taybad County, Razavi Khorasan Province, Iran. At the 2006 census, its population was 258, in 51 families.

References 

Populated places in Taybad County